Good Eats is an informational cooking show in which Alton Brown would go into the history and or science of a particular dish or item that was the focal point of each episode.  The show started with Food Network, airing 245 episodes of 14 seasons with eight specials and five shorts which aired on the Food Network website. In October 2018, Cooking Channel created a "Reloaded" season with 13 episodes. Season 15, titled Good Eats: The Return, began airing August 25, 2019 on Food Network.

Series overview

Episodes

Season 1 (1999)

Season 2 (1999-2000)

Season 3 (2000-01)

Season 4 (2001)

Season 5 (2001-02)

Season 6 (2002-03)

Season 7 (2003-04)

Season 8 (2004-05)

Season 9 (2005-06) 
In season 9, the show began broadcasting in 1080i high-definition in addition to standard-definition.

Season 10 (2006-07)

Season 11 (2007-08) 
During season 11, Food Network tried to synchronize episodes with seasonal celebrations, changing the airdates of some episodes.

Season 12 (2008-09)

Season 13 (2009-10)

Season 14 (2010-11)

Good Eats: Reloaded, Season 1 (2018-19)

Season 15, Good Eats: The Return (2019) 
The sequence, air date, and episode numbers for season 15 (named onscreen as Good Eats: The Return) are unclear. Available sources including Food Network's Episode listings and streaming service disagree. The table below uses information from Food Network's streaming service.

Good Eats: Reloaded, Season 2 (2020)

Season 16, Good Eats: The Return (2021) 
Season 16 of Good Eats premiered first on the Discovery+ streaming service. The table below uses information from Discovery+ for the streaming air dates. The episodes later aired on television on the Food Network.

Specials (1999-2020)

Shorts (2002-09)

Notes

References 

Good Eats